Tya or TYA may refer to:

Languages
 Tauya language, a language in Papua New Guinea

Places
 Tin Yat stop, a Light Rail stop in Hong Kong
 Tya, Sogn og Fjordane, a river in Sogn og Fjordane county, Norway
 Tya, Trøndelag, a river in Trøndelag county, Norway

Other
 Tya (unit), a measure of time meaning "thousands of years ago"
 Theatre for Young Audiences, a branch of theatre arts attended by or created for younger audiences
 Ten Years After, a British blues rock band